Kersti Merilaas ( in Narva – 8 March 1986 in Tallinn) was an Estonian poet and translator. In addition, she wrote poems and prose for children and plays.

Early life and education
Kersti Merilaas was born Eugenie Moorberg in Narva, Estonia shortly before the outbreak of the First World War. She spent her early childhood in St. Petersburg, Russia with her mother, Anna Moorberg and sister. The family returned to Estonia in 1917 because of the turmoil of the Russian Revolution. From 1921 to 1927 she attended school in the village of Kiltsi, then furthered her studies in Väike-Maarja and Rakvere in Lääne-Viru County. In 1932, she completed high school in Tapa, Estonia.

Career
In 1935, she made her literary debut with a collection of poems titled Loomingus.

In 1936, Merilaas married the Estonian writer and translator August Sang (1914–1969) and the couple had a son named Joel Sang in 1950 who would go on to become a poet, literary critic, linguist, translator and publicist.

From 1936, Merilaas lived in Tartu, where she was employed as a librarian. She was a member of the influential group of Estonian poets brought together in 1938 by literary scholar Ants Oras who was greatly influenced by T. S. Eliot. The small circle of poets became known as Arbujad ("Soothsayers") and included Heiti Talvik, Paul Viiding, Betti Alver, Uku Masing and Bernard Kangro That year, her anthology of poetry Maantee tuuled was published to much critical acclaim, particularly for its lyrical preoccupation with love and nature. Also in 1938 she joined the Estonian Writers' Union.

After the Soviet occupation and annexation of Estonia in 1944, Merilaas' work was viewed by authorities as disreputable and promoting "bourgeois nationalism". In 1950, Merilaas was forced to resign from the Soviet Writers Association of Estonia. During this time, Merilaas was allowed to continue writing children's literature. In 1960, after the relaxation of Soviet authorities, Merilaas was again permitted to write literature for adults.

Besides poetry and prose, Merilaas wrote libretti for three operas by Estonian composer Gustav Ernesaks and translated German works of Bertolt Brecht, Georg Christoph Lichtenberg and Johann Wolfgang von Goethe into the Estonian language.

Merilaas died in Tallinn, Estonia in 1986 at the age of 72.

Selected works
Poetry
Loomingus (1935)
Maantee tuuled (1938) 
Rannapääsuke (1963)
Kevadised koplid (1966)  
Kuukressid (1969)
Antud ja võetud (1981)

Children's Books
Munapühad (1940) 
Kallis kodu (collection of poems, 1944) 
Päikese paistel collection of poems (1948) 
Turvas (1950) 
Veskilaul (1959)
Lugu mustast ja valgest (1962) 
Lumest lumeni (1982) 
Kui vanaema noor oli (poetry anthology, 1983) 
Kindakiri. – Варежки (poem in Estonian and Russian, 1986) 
Siit siiani. Piksepill (collection of poems, 1989. Posthumous)

Plays
Kaks viimast rida (1973) 
Pilli-Tiidu (1974)

Awards
In 1976, Kersti Merilaas was awarded the Friedebert Tuglas Short Story Award for her work Eilsete perest.

Further reading
Kiin, Sirje: Kersti Merilaas: luuletaja elu. (in Estonian). Eesti Raamat. Tallinn 1989   
Hasselblatt, Cornelius: Geschichte der estnischen Literatur. (in German). Walter de Gruyter. Berlin, New York. 2006.

References

1913 births
1986 deaths
People from Narva
People from Yamburgsky Uyezd
20th-century Estonian poets
Estonian translators
Estonian women poets
20th-century women writers
20th-century translators
Soviet poets
Soviet translators